This is a list of ancient Dacian towns and fortresses from all the territories once inhabited by Dacians, Getae and Moesi. The large majority of them are located in the traditional territory of the Dacian Kingdom at the time of Burebista. This area includes the present-day countries of Romania and Moldova, as well as parts of mostly southern and eastern Ukraine, Slovakia, Poland and Hungary, as well as ancient Moesia (Eastern Serbia, Northern Bulgaria). However some isolated settlements are located in Dalmatia (modern Albania and Croatia) as is the case of Thermidava, or in Dardania as is Quemedava.

The Dacian towns are also called davae (singular dava) since many names were composed of an initial lexical element affixed to -dava, -daua, -deva, -deba, -daba, or -dova, which meant "city", "town" or "fortress"" in the Dacian language (<PIE *dhe-, "to set, place" or *dhewa, "settlement"). Generally, the name indicated a tribal center or an important settlement, usually fortified.

The known towns names have been are attested by Ptolemy (1st century AD) and other ancient writers, but many have not been identified in the field yet. Conversely, there are many recent discoveries of Dacian settlements and fortresses, but most of them have no assigned names yet.

Some of the Dacian settlements and the fortresses employed the traditional Murus Dacicus (Dacian Wall) construction technique.

Table

See also 
 List of ancient cities in Thrace and Dacia
 Dacia
 Dacians
 Romanian archaeology
 List of castra in Dacia
 List of castles in Romania

Notes

References

Ancient

Modern

Further reading 
 Dacian Davae in Enciclopedia Dacica 
 Dacian materials and construction techniques in Enciclopedia Dacica 
 Sorin Olteanu's Project: Linguae Thraco-Daco-Moesorum - Toponyms (partially )
 Lists of Dacian fortresses, towns and citadels

External links 

 Dacian towns and fortress - Google Maps
 Dacian towns and fortress - Google Earth
 Dacian Davae in Enciclopedia Dacica 
 Dacian materials and construction techniques in Enciclopedia Dacica 
 Sorin Olteanu's Project: Linguae Thraco-Daco-Moesorum - Toponyms Section (partially )
 Lists of Dacian fortresses, towns and citadels

Dacian towns
Fortresses, Dacian

ro:Listă de cetăți dacice